The Late 2011 Telangana protests refers to a chain of protests as part of Telangana movement between September and December 2011. Sakala Janula samme or All peoples strike is the biggest protest of all. The strike lasted for over six weeks mainly affecting public services and local economy. On a call given by JAC, road blockades on national highways throughout Telangana, rail blockade and the strike of auto rikshaw union were organised on 24 and 25 September causing disruption in transport services. As the All People's strike entered the 30th day on 14 October 2011, Medak's MP Vijayashanti criticised the Congress high command for the delay in making the decision on Telangana and said Congress wants the issue to prolong until 2014. She further said the strike should continue until the formation of Telanana state. After 42 days, on 24 October, government employees unions called off the strike. Kodandaram said that the strike had impacted the overall thinking of the Centre towards creation of separate State and the movement will continue with other protest activities.

Sakala Janula Samme

On 12 September 2011, a day before Sakala Janula Samme(All people's strike), TRS organised a public meeting in Karimnagar which was attended by over a million people including TJAC leaders, BJP and New Democracy party leaders. Starting 13 September, as part of 'strike by all section of people' supporting Telangana statehood, government employees throughout Telangana stayed out of work, lawyers boycotted courts and 60,000 coal miners of Singareni Collieries(SCCL Ltd.) also joined the strike. On 14 & 15 September, nearly 450 movie Theaters in Telangana were closed at the call given by Telangana film chamber. Starting 16 September, government teachers joined the strike. Private school managements declared one day holiday in support of the strike. On 19 September, state road transport corporation employees and state electricity board employees in Telangana joined the indefinite strike.

On a call given by JAC, road blockades on national highways throughout Telangana, rail blockade and the strike of auto rikshaw union were organised on 24 and 25 September causing disruption in transport services. Virtually all sections of people joined this strike.
On 30 September, as the strike entered the 18th day, even while Congress central leadership met several Telangana congress leaders, JAC called a bundh in Hyderabad city. On 2 October, JAC leaders, employee unions leaders and TRS leaders including KCR met Prime minister to explain the situation in Telangna due to the strike and asked to expedite the decision on the statehood demand. The strike has resulted in an unprecedented power crisis in the state with only 223 MU of power generated against the demand of 275MU impacting both the industry and agriculture.

On 9 October, some workers of the Youth Congress agitated and threw chairs at each other at the Gandhi Bhavan in Hyderabad demanding postponement of a membership drive till an official announcement on Telangana. They also demanded that a separate Telangana Youth Congress be formed for the youth from Telangana. On 10 October, Telangana activists attacked a private college in Hyderabad and threw stones at the windows of a college in Kukatpally, where majority residents are migrants from Andhra region, badly damaging the window panes. Worried parents of some children protested outside the college demanding that schools and colleges be excluded from the strikes and conflicts as the students have missed classes for a month already. The majority of colleges and schools remained shut in the twin cities of Hyderabad and Secunderabad.

After being criticised by both the Congress high command as well as the Centre over how he has been handling the issue, CM N Kiran Kumar Reddy said that the government would adopt a zero-tolerance system and will initiate stern action against anyone trying to create any law and order problem or cause any inconvenience to the people. He cautioned them saying that the stir is spoiling the prospects of the youth.
After 22 days of strike, the APSRTC resumed plying buses after one of the unions suspended the strike. Telangana union leaders condemned the decision and said that a union leader belonging to Andhra-Seema region had no right to withdraw the strike. This led to split in the union and Telangana union leaders floated a separate body and decided to continue the strike.
Due to this, only few buses returned to service. On 13 October, the parents of most school-going children warned the TJAC that to call of the strike for the schools and colleges by 15 October after which they will chalk out their course of action. Eight Congress MPs from Telangana, who resigned in July demanding a separate state of Telangana, insisted the speaker to accept their resignations on 12 October. They also demanded that the Group-II exams, screening test for thousands of state government jobs, be postponed until the strike is over.

As the All People's strike entered the 30th day on 14 October 2011, Medak's MP Vijayashanti criticised the Congress high command for the delay in making the decision on Telangana and said Congress wants the issue to prolong until 2014. She further said the strike should continue until the formation of Telanana state. On that day, the government of Andhra Pradesh decided to hold talks with the Employees Joint Action Committee and initiate action against uniformed personnel who participated in the strike KT Rama Rao alleged that the CM of Andhra Pradesh was bribing the T Congress MLAs to lure them out of the agitation.  This was strongly refuted by the Congress leaders who demanded an apology from KTR and challenged him to reveal the names of MLAs who took bribe.

On the 1st day of Rail blockade on 15 October 110 trains were cancelled and 68 trains were diverted. The railways operated 12 trains and Hyderabad metro trails with full police protection. Telangana protestors tried to have sit in on rail platforms or on railway tracks at various places. Police arrested thousands of protesters including 8 MPs and 4 MLAs. On same day, employee unions of road transport corporation called off the strike. On 16 October, JAC gave a call for Telangana Bundh(general strike) for next day to protest police action during the agitation and the rail blockade. They then cancelled the 3rd day of rail blockade.  Teachers union also said they will attend the schools in the interest of students but they will not sign the attendance registers and will not take the salaries. Some teachers donated the salary they got for the strike period. They felt that teachers have become scapegoats at the hands of their state leaders who have a personal agenda and called off the strike as part of this. Normal life was again affected as the public transport facilities, especially busses which were properly resumed after the 28-day-long strike were again off the roads. Schools, colleges and offices were again shut for 17 October, as the agitation continued. On the same day, Coal miners called off their strike.

On 17 October, Pocharam Srinivas Reddy, who resigned from assembly and from TDP to join TRS, was re-elected to assembly. He got about 68% of polled votes while his opponent from congress got 27% votes. TDP did not field a candidate. After his victory in Banswada bypoll, which was far lesser margin than he anticipated, he warned Andhra settlers in the region with dire consequences for not voting for him. He had hoped for one lakh majority in the byelection in view of the ongoing high voltage Telangana movement. He accused Andhra settlers of ignoring the Telangana sentiment and voting for his opponent. This hurt the feelings of settlers in the region.

Efforts to end strike
With the agitation for statehood to Telangana intensifying, the congress has decided to speed up all the discussions and quickly solve the problem.
On 30 September 2011 Ghulam Nabi Azad, Congress party's AP state in-charge, submitted to Congress president an internal party report about Telangana issue after holding consultations with leaders from Telangana, Rayalaseema and coastal Andhra regions for over two months.
On 8 October, Azad said that the key leaders of the Congress and the centre have met nine leaders from Andhra Pradesh including the chief minister and are working on finding a solution to the issue as soon as possible. PM Manmohan Singh indicated that resolving the Telangana statehood issue might "take some time." Maintaining that there has not been any "inaction" by the government over the crisis, the Prime Minister said that "given the complications involved in settlement, it will take some time." Dr Singh said that the government "is engaged in widespread dialogue and discussions with all the stakeholders and hopes to reach a win-win situation for all concerned through the process."

After 42 days, on 24 October, government employees unions called off the strike. Kodandaram said that the strike had impacted the overall thinking of the Centre towards creation of separate State and the movement will continue with other protest activities.

Criticism of the Strike

Madiga Reservation Porata Samiti (MRPS) president criticised that KCR, TJAC Chairman Kodandaram, Harish Rao and others were encouraging the students to take active part in the ongoing agitation for Telangana, and alleged that they were not allowing their own children to take part in the stir. While demanding that the Telangana leaders disclose the details of where their children were pursuing studies, he said that children from oppressed sections of the society, were being deprived of the opportunity to pursue studies, under the influence of the T-stir, while the children from the T-leaders were being sent abroad or other areas, to pursue studies without any disturbance. This opinion was also voiced by Samaikyandhra protagonists who pointed out that while farmers, school children, parents and general public were facing untold misery due to the strike, the life of rich people like KCR continues to be luxurious as they ply in high-end cars and their children study in top corporate schools, which remain open despite the crippling strike.

On 22 October, activists of the Prajasanghala (People's organisations) JAC protested in front of Prof. Kodandram's house alleging that the TJAC changed its stand on Sakala Janula Samme and on a separate Telangana after Kodandaram and KCR's visit to New Delhi. They alleged the TJAC had entered into a pact with the Centre and is deliberately diluting the movement.

On 11 October, a case was filed against KCR, under IPC section 153, for delivering instigating speeches and creating rift between people from different regions in the state. FIR said that he had tried to instigate people to attack Telangana representatives for not resigning for the cause of Telangana. Later that day, Police have also added the two leaders Swami Goud and Vithal of the Telangana Joint Action Committee after they demanded that the Police of Hyderabad city would also join the struggle for a separate state. The Samaikyandhra Joint Action Committee reported that KCR was behaving rudely while he was in Telangana region and wise when he was Delhi, at the Union government. They also demanded that the government should seize the properties of KCR as to recover from the losses caused by the All people's strike.

Many Telangana activists headed by Telangana Praja Front leader Gaddar are contemplating to form a new party to take the Telangana movement forward. Dr Sangam Prithviraj, leader of the Telangana Students Joint Action Committee, who supports Gaddar in forming the new political force, also blamed KCR for the movement fizzling out. "KCR kept the students out of the agitation this time and this was an intentional ploy to ensure that the new state is not formed," he said.

Losses due to the strike
While the striking employees of RTC got their wages and bonuses for the strike period, the corporation has been hit by financial crisis. APSRTC already with a Rs. 310 crore loss in the financial year suffered another Rs. 200 crore loss due to the "Sakala Janula Samme".
On 19 October, Singareni staff from 3 districts who were striking for 35 days resumed their work after the management agreed to adjust leave against strike period with wages. The strike resulted in a loss of Rs. 600 crore for the Singareni Collieries Co Ltd. An additional Rs. 120 crores was lost towards payment of wages to employees for the strike period.
A generation loss of 546.2 Million Unit (MU) and 294.9 MU respectively in Ramagundam and Simhadri Thermal Power Stations situated in Andhra Pradesh was reported by NTPC due to shortage of coal. Andhra Pradesh Power Generation Corporation Ltd. (APGENCO) also reported a generation loss of 28 MU in their Kakatiya thermal power station during the same period.
The state government also lost around Rs. 250 crore due to power purchases from other states. It also affected the production of long steel in India.
The water board suffered Rs. 5 crore loss during the strike.
The South Central railway lost Rs. 12.63 crores till 24 September due to the rail roko programmes.
The Assocham estimated tangible losses in excess of Rs. 10,000 crores in only 15 days of the strike.
A revenue loss of Rs. 50 crore every day to the government due to strike by excise employees.
Manufacturers of active pharmaceutical ingredients that go into medication have lost Rs. 500 crore till 26 September because of the strike.
Northern Power Distribution Company Ltd's (NPDCL) revenues amounting to Rs 320 crores were held up

In response to a lawsuit that seeks a direction that a new state shouldn't be carved out from the parent territory, the Supreme Court of India took strong exception to the prolonged agitation during which normal life gets affected, courts become paralysed and colossal damage is done to public property. It sought responses from the AP government and TRS.

Aftermath
On 29 October 2011, three Congress party MLAs belonging to Telangana region resigned and joined TRS in protest as they were disappointed with Congress leadership's delay in Telangana state formation. With fears of Maoists infiltrating the Telangana movement, the CM of Andhra Pradesh was provided with bullet proof podium for his speech on AP formation day on 1 November 2011. On 1 November, Congress MLA Komatireddy Venkat Reddy started an indefinite hunger strike until the central government announced a roadmap for Telangana state. 5 days later, the fast was broken when police arrested him under Section 309 of IPC (attempt to commit suicide) and shifted him to NIMS, Hyderabad where he was kept under intravenous fluids. He ended his fast on 9 November. The 97-year-old Freedom fighter Konda Laxman Bapuji also launched his week-long satyagraha at Jantar Mantar in New Delhi, demanding statehood to the region.

On 7 November 2011 Actress Shriya Saran was attacked by a mob claiming to be TRS activists during a shoot in Hyderabad. They threatened her to say 'Jai Telangana' by shouting out cuss words. The actress later tweeted,

How can they break my car, throw stones, stop shoot and threaten me to say Jai Telangana. That too in broad day light, Police staring at all of this. What about freedom and safety? Thank god the stone didn't hit me. Both the windows of my car are broken. I am disgusted, I'm born in India. I deserve my freedom and safety is my right (sic).

TRS activists also attacked Parakala Prabhakar when in a Television interview he said that there was no Telangana sentiment among people and whatever Prof. Jayashankar claimed about injustice meted out to Telangana was false propaganda and he was ready to prove his point given a chance.

On 10 November 2011 Andhra Pradesh State Director General of Police said there is no active involvement of Maoists in the Telangana movement. After the proposal by UP Chief Minister Mayawati to split Uttar Pradesh into four states, the BJP, which is a strong advocate of smaller states, demanded formation of the second State Reorganisation Commission (SRC) for restructuring and splitting big states into smaller ones.

Minister of State for Home Affairs, Jitendra Singh informed in the Rajya Sabha that the government of India will move to create a new state only when there is a consensus in the parent state that one part be separated to form a new state. In December 2011, TRS Politburo member C Sudhakar was sentenced to one year in jail under the provisions of National Security Act. He was arrested during the Sakala Janula Samme on the charges that he hurled stones on RTC buses and prevented Andhra region buses from plying in Telangana. On 19 January 2012, BJP led by State party president Kishan Reddy started the 22-day Telangana 'Poru Yatra', a journey of 3500 km in Telangana, to touch 986 villages and 88 assembly constituencies stressing the need for Telangana stance. Though the tour was successful in reiterating the party's pro-Telangana stance, it could not garner as much support as hoped because of the indifferent attitude of the TRS & TJAC. In fact the failure of the TRS in declaring its support to Kishan Reddy's yatra has resulted in growing differences between the two parties.

See also
Samaikyandhra Movement
Vishalandhra Movement
Telangana Movement

References

External links
 Telangana Talks – Voice your opinion for Separation 
 Telanaga movement article in US Library of Congress
 Official history of AP on AP government website
 Video (30 minutes): Still Seeking Justice – A documentary on Telangana
 Some research papers by Telangana proponents
 State reorganisation committee reports at Wikisource
 How SKC Report tried to suppress truth and deceive Telangana – Published by Telangana Development Forum

2011 in India
Protests in India
Telangana movement
2011 protests
Manmohan Singh administration
Telangana Rashtra Samithi